Kristjan Matošević (born 5 June 1997) is a Slovenian footballer who plays as a goalkeeper for Italian  club Triestina on loan from Cosenza.

Career

Before the second half of 2015–16, Matošević was sent on loan to Italian Serie A side Lazio from Catania in the Italian Serie A.

In 2017, he trialed for Dutch club Groningen.

Before the second half of 2016–17, he signed for Domžale in the Slovenian top flight.

Before the second half of 2017–18, Matošević signed for Slovenian second division outfit Mura.

In 2020, he signed for Cosenza in the Italian second division from Italian third division team Triestina.

On 28 January 2023, returned to Triestina on loan with an option to buy.

References

External links
 

1997 births
Sportspeople from Koper
Living people
Slovenian footballers
Association football goalkeepers
S.S. Lazio players
NK Domžale players
U.S. Triestina Calcio 1918 players
Cosenza Calcio players
NK Ankaran players
NŠ Mura players
Catania S.S.D. players
Slovenian PrvaLiga players
Serie C players
Slovenian Second League players
Serie B players
Slovenian expatriate footballers
Slovenian expatriate sportspeople in Italy
Expatriate footballers in Italy